The Army Combat Boot is the primary issue combat boot of the United States Army since 2002, intended for use in conjunction with the Army Combat Uniform.

Variants

There are two variants for different climates. Both variants are tan-colored, with a moisture-resistant, rough-side-out cattlehide leather and nylon duck cloth upper. The sole consists of a shock-absorbing direct attach poly-ether polyurethane midsole, with an abrasion-resistant, slip-resistant rubber outsole. It has a combination eyelet and speed-lace lacing system.

Temperate
The Army Combat Boot (Temperate Weather)  (ACB (TW)) contains a waterproof breathable membrane and integrated safety features: limited flame resistance, thermal insulation, and liquid fuel penetration protection.

Hot
The Army Combat Boot (Hot Weather) (ACB (HW)) has two drainage eyelets on the inner arch.

See also
Mountain Combat Boot
Modular Boot System

References

United States Army uniforms
Military boots
Military equipment introduced in the 2000s